WDCB (90.9 FM) is a public radio station broadcasting a jazz format, serving primarily the Chicago area, and beyond through its streaming audio. The station is licensed to and owned by College of DuPage, in Glen Ellyn, Illinois, United States, and mostly features live and locally hosted programming, along with select programs from NPR, PRX, and United Stations Radio Networks. Music from WDCB can be heard on CAN TV channel 42 in Chicago.

History
WDCB began broadcasting July 5, 1977 and was originally a part-time station, sharing time on the frequency with WEPS. The station's call sign stood for "DuPage Community Broadcasting". In its early years, the station aired classical, jazz, and folk music, College of DuPage courses, community affairs, and entertainment programming. The station began full-time operations in October 1987, after an agreement was reached for WEPS to move to a new frequency. Throughout the 1980s, WDCB was also used on the Cablevision of Downers Grove's Local/Public Access Channel.

By the late 1980s, jazz had become the station's primary format. Since then, WDCB's format has included a diverse variety of musical genres, including blues, roots rock, bluegrass, Celtic, folk, big band, Afro-Cuban jazz, and world music, along with old-time radio shows, though jazz makes up a majority of the station's programming. COD courses continued to air on the station until 2001. Classical Confab aired Sundays until late 2005. WDCB is also the home of Those Were The Days, the long-running old-time radio program that used to be hosted by Chuck Schaden. In 2009, Steve Darnall took over as the second host of the show. The show was announced for years by Ken Alexander, who died November 5, 2022.

As the result of a 2016 agreement with Chicago Public Media, WDCB's programming is now also heard on WRTE 90.7 FM, from a low power 6-watt signal located on Chicago's near-west side. While WDCB's primary 90.9 FM signal does reach all of Chicago, the 90.7 FM signal offers better reception for many WDCB listeners on the west side of Chicago, as well as Chicago's near-north and near-south side neighborhoods.

Programming
WDCB broadcasts more than 130 hours of jazz every week. Since 2000, John Russell Ghrist has hosted the Saturday afternoon big band program Midwest Ballroom. Steve Darnall hosts the long running old-time radio program Those Were The Days, which airs Saturday afternoons. WDCB's extensive blues lineup includes a 10-hour block of blues every Saturday night, led off by popular Chicago blues radio veteran Tom Marker ( who began hosting on WDCB in 2015), and ending with Steve Cushing's historical, early-blues program Blues Before Sunrise. In 2015, WDCB became the new broadcast home of former XM host Michelle Sammartino's program, Jammin' Jazz: Jazz for the New Generation. Local celebrity Wayne Messmer also hosts a vocal jazz show on Sunday nights. In 2017, WDCB added prominent Chicago jazz singer Dee Alexander to its on-air lineup.

In addition to its predominantly live and locally hosted programming, WDCB also airs a number of nationally syndicated music programs, including NPR's "Jazz Night in America" as well as independent programs including "American Routes," "Night Lights," "Blues From the Red Rooster Lounge," and "The Grateful Dead Radio Hour." WDCB was also home to The Folk Sampler until it ended its run in Summer 2018.

Staff
The station manager of WDCB is Dan Bindert. The music director is Paul Abella. WDCB is not student-operated, though COD students work at the station.

WDCB's stable of on-air personalities includes Bruce Oscar, Paul Abella, Orbert Davis, Dee Alexander, Bill O'Connell, and Marshall Vente, all of whom are prominent Chicago-based jazz musicians, along with longtime hosts Leslie Keros, Jay Greene, Matthew Hermes, Jeanne Franks, Bob Signorelli, Dona Mullen, Al Carter-Bey, and Andy Schultz. The daily lineup of Abella (mornings), Keros (middays), and Oscar (afternoons) has been intact since late 2019, after the retirement of long-time jazz personality Barry Winograd (who still hosts his early-jazz show When Jazz Was King on Saturday mornings). Oscar has been with WDCB since 1992.

See also
 List of jazz radio stations in the United States

References

External links

DCB
Glen Ellyn, Illinois
Jazz radio stations in the United States
DCB
NPR member stations
Radio stations established in 1977
1977 establishments in Illinois